The Cundill History Prize (formerly the Cundill Prize in Historical Literature) was founded in 2008 by Peter Cundill to recognize and promote literary and academic achievement in history. The prize is presented annually to an author who has published a non-fiction book in the prior year that is likely to have profound literary, social, and academic impact in the area of history. At a value of US$75,000, the Grand Prize is claimed to be the richest non-fiction historical literature prize in the world. In addition, two "Recognition of Excellence" prizes of US$10,000 each are awarded. The winners of the prizes are selected by an independent jury of at least five internationally qualified individuals selected by McGill University. The Cundill Prize in History at McGill is administered by McGill University's Dean of Arts, with the help of the McGill Institute for the Study of Canada (MISC).

When the Prize was announced in April 2008, Mr. Cundill noted that he "…was surprised to learn there were no major prizes in history." He explained his affinity to history: "I am an investment researcher of finance and I think there is an analogy between the two disciplines – both study the past to understand the present and predict the future."

Honorees

See also
 List of history awards

References 

2008 establishments in Quebec
Awards established in 2008
Canadian non-fiction literary awards
History awards